Philips and the Monkey Pen is a 2013 Indian Malayalam language children's film written by Rojin Thomas and directed by Rojin Thomas and Shanil Muhammed. The film stars Sanoop Santhosh, Jayasurya, Remya Nambeesan, Vijay Babu and Joy Mathew.

The film revolves around a ten-year-old called Ryan Philip (Sanoop Santhosh) and his adventures with a magical pen called the Monkey Pen. The film was produced by Vijay Babu and actress Sandra Thomas under Friday Film House banner. Neil D’Cunha is the cinematographer and the music has been scored by Remya Nambeesan's brother, Rahul Subrahmaniam.

The film released on 2 November 2013 coinciding with Diwali in Kerala. The film completed 111 days in theaters and was a commercial success at the box-office. The film won Kerala State Film Award for Best Children's Film and Kerala State Film Award for Best Child Artist (Sanoop Santhosh).

Plot
Ryan Philip (Master Sanoop) is a smart cute school boy who has problems understanding maths. As he struggles to escape from doing his maths homework, he resorts to mischievous acts, not realizing the trouble he is making. He has a good relationship with his dad Roy Philip (Jayasurya) and mother Sameera (Remya Nambeeshan) and Ryan's grandfather Richard Philip (Joy Mathew) who is an antique collector. On visiting his grandfather Ryan gets a magical pen called monkey pen. This monkey pen does his maths homework and soon changes his whole life.

After many circumstances and the death of his crush and girlfriend in school(who is in the same class he studies) in a school bus accident, Ryan's life changes in a surprising way. The hatred relationship between his maths teacher(Vijay Babu) and him changes when he does the homework regularly and he  and his friends hardly try for a maths exibhition and fails. His maths teacher gets a transfer because of Ryan's doing earlier to trap him. But he regrets later and confess to the teacher at the farewell. At last, Ryan understands that the one who had been doing his maths homework was not the monkey pen but his father. In the credits scene, it is shown Ryan studying the multiplication table.

Cast

Sanoop Santhosh as Ryan Philip
Jayasurya as Roy Philip
Remya Nambeesan as Sameera Roy
Joy Mathew as Captain Richard Philip
Innocent as God
Diya as Joan
Gourav Menon as Jahangir R. a.k.a. Jugru
Aakhash Santhosh as Rama Ramana Rajeeva Nandanan a.k.a. Raman
Antony Elrin D'Silva as Innocent P. Varghese
Nidheesh Boban as Decimal
Augen as Kannan
Mathew Joy as Rahul
Mukesh as Principal Charles Leon
Vijay Babu as Padmachandran a.k.a. Pappan
Pradeep Kottayam as Pavithran
Kiran Aravindakshan as Joan's Father
Dean Rowlins as Robert Bristow
Sudheer Karamana as Stephen, Decimal's Father
Sasi Kalinga as Moorthy
Nikhita  Naiyer as Joan's friend
Chemban Vinod Jose as SI Varghese (cameo appearance)

Critical reception
Philips and the Monkey Pen got very much positive reviews from critics and other audiences.

Deccan Chronicle gave 3.5/5 rating and said, "This, to date, must surely rate as the year's top contender of the prestigious Swarna Kamal for the Best Children's Film. It lights up the righteous path without being preachy. When a son says to his father, "I thought the truth would pain you", the wise one smiles, inspiringly, "The truth isn't bitter; it is the lies that are excessively sweet"."

Awards
 Kerala State Film Award for Best Children's Film
 Kerala State Film Award for Best Children's Film Director- Rojin Thomas and Shanil Muhammed
 Kerala State Film Award for Best Child Artist - Sanoop Santhosh
 Kerala Film Critics Award for Best Child Artist
 Kerala Film Critics Award for Best Children Film

Soundtrack
The film's soundtrack contains 6 songs, all composed by Rahul Subrahmanian. Lyrics by Anu Elizabeth Jose, Sibi Padiyara, and Mamtha Seemanth.

References

External links
 

Indian children's films
2013 films